The Warwickshire Police and Crime Commissioner is the police and crime commissioner, an elected official tasked with setting out the way crime is tackled by Warwickshire Police in the English County of Warwickshire. The post was created in November 2012, following an election held on 15 November 2012, and replaced the Warwickshire Police Authority. The current incumbent is Philip Seccombe, who represents the Conservative Party.

List of Warwickshire Police and Crime Commissioners

Electoral history

References

Police and crime commissioners in England